Duluth University may mean a university in Duluth, Minnesota

 University of Minnesota Duluth
 Duluth Business University